Robert Christopher Elswit,  (born April 22, 1950) is an American cinematographer. He has collaborated with Paul Thomas Anderson on six of his films and won the Academy Award for Best Cinematography for There Will Be Blood. Elswit has also collaborated with directors and screenwriters Tony and Dan Gilroy on all of the six films that either brother directed.

Biography
Elswit was born in Los Angeles. An early short film he worked on was the 1982 television adaptation for Ray Bradbury's short story All Summer in a Day. Elswit worked as a visual effects camera operator at John Dykstra's Apogee Productions Inc. on each films, including Star Trek: The Motion Picture, The Empire Strikes Back and E.T. the Extra-Terrestrial, before shooting made-for-television films and shows. Elswit has been a fierce defender of shooting on film, and whenever possible avoids using digital cameras. Images shot digitally, he said, have "no texture, no grain." He started shooting digitally, starting with Nightcrawler. Elswit has worked with George Clooney several times. He shot his black and white, multiple-Oscar nominated film Good Night, and Good Luck. Elswit shot the film in color, and converted the film into black and white in post production. According to Elswit, the technique preserved the subtlety of the colors (as complex shades of blacks and greys) and made the overall look much richer in the final film. Elswit was nominated for the Academy Award for Best Cinematography for Good Night, and Good Luck, but lost to Dion Beebe for Memoirs of a Geisha. Elswit won the award for There Will Be Blood in 2008. Elswit has cited early independent filmmaker John Cassavetes as a major influence. Elswit is a graduate of the University of Southern California School of Cinematic Arts and worked there as a teaching assistant. Elswit is godfather to the actor Jake Gyllenhaal.

Filmography

Film

Short films

Television 
TV movies

TV series

Awards and nominations
 Academy Award for Best Cinematography
2006: Good Night, and Good Luck (nominated)
2008: There Will Be Blood (won)

 American Society of Cinematographers Award for Outstanding Achievement in Cinematography
2006: Good Night, and Good Luck (nominated)
2008: There Will Be Blood

 Austin Film Critics Association for Best Cinematography
2007: There Will Be Blood

 Awards Circuit Community Award for Best Cinematography
2007: There Will Be Blood (nominated)
2005: Good Night, and Good Luck (nominated)

 BAFTA Award for Best Cinematography
2008: There Will Be Blood (nominated)

 Boston Society of Film Critics Award for Best Cinematography
2005: Good Night, and Good Luck

 British Society of Cinematographers Award for Best Cinematography
2008: There Will Be Blood (nominated)

 CableACE Award for Direction of Photography and/or Lighting Direction for a Dramatic or Theatrical Special/Movie or Miniseries
1988: Long Gone (nominated)

 Camerimage Golden Frog Award
2005: Good Night, and Good Luck (nominated)

 Chicago Film Critics Association Award for Best Cinematography
2006: Good Night, and Good Luck (nominated)
2007: There Will Be Blood (nominated)
2014: Inherent Vice (nominated)

 Daytime Emmy Award for Outstanding Achievement in Cinematography
1986: CBS Schoolbreak Special (1984)
(For episode "The War Between The Classes")

 Houston Film Critics Society for Best Cinematography
2014: Inherent Vice (nominated)

 Independent Spirit Award for Best Cinematography
2006: Good Night, and Good Luck
1998: Sydney (nominated)

 International Online Cinema Awards for Best Cinematography
2008: There Will Be Blood (nominated)

 International Online Film Critics' Poll Award for Best Cinematography
2009: There Will Be Blood (nominated)

 Los Angeles Film Critics Association Award for Best Cinematography
2006: Good Night, and Good Luck
2007: There Will Be Blood (2nd place)

 National Society of Film Critics Award for Best Cinematography
2008: There Will Be Blood
2006: Good Night, and Good Luck (2nd place)
2003: Punch-Drunk Love (3rd place)

 New York Film Critics Circle Award for Best Cinematographer
2007: There Will Be Blood
2005: Good Night, and Good Luck (2nd place)

 New York Film Critics Online for Best Cinematography
2007: There Will Be Blood

 Online Film Critics Society Award for Best Cinematography
2008: There Will Be Blood (nominated)
2006: Good Night, and Good Luck (nominated)

 San Diego Film Critics Society Award for Best Cinematography
2014: Nightcrawler
2007: There Will Be Blood (2nd place)

 Satellite Award for Best Cinematography
2015: Inherent Vice (nominated)
2010: Salt (nominated)
2007: There Will Be Blood (nominated)
2005: Good Night, and Good Luck (nominated)

 St. Louis Film Critics Association
2014: Nightcrawler (nominated)
2007: There Will Be Blood (nominated)
2005: Good Night, and Good Luck (nominated)

 Utah Film Critics Association Award for Best Cinematography
2014: Nightcrawler

References

External links

1950 births
Living people
American cinematographers
AFI Conservatory alumni
Artists from Los Angeles
Best Cinematographer Academy Award winners
Film people from Los Angeles
Independent Spirit Award winners
USC School of Cinematic Arts alumni